Sodium propanoate or sodium propionate is the sodium salt of propionic acid which has the chemical formula Na(C2H5COO). This white crystalline solid is deliquescent in moist air.

Reactions
It is produced by the reaction of propionic acid and sodium carbonate or sodium hydroxide.

Uses
It is used as a food preservative and is represented by the food labeling E number E281 in Europe; it is used primarily as a mold inhibitor in bakery products. It is approved for use as a food additive in the EU, USA and Australia and New Zealand (where it is listed by its INS number 281).

Structure

Anhydrous sodium propionate is a polymeric structure, featuring trigonal prismatic Na+ centers bonded to six oxygen ligands provided by the carboxylates.  A layered structure is observed, with the hydrophobic ethyl groups projecting into the layered galleries.  With hydrated sodium propionate, some of these Na-carboxylate linkages are displaced by water.

See also
 Propionic acid, E 280
 Calcium propionate, E 282
 Potassium propionate, E 283

References

External links
 Sodium propanoate at Sci-toys.com

Propionates
Organic sodium salts
E-number additives